William Robert Roffey (6 February 1954) is an English former footballer, who played as a defender.

League career

Roffey was born Stepney, Greater London. He began his youth career at Crystal Palace signing professionally in May 1971. In October 1973, he moved on to Leyton Orient, for whom he made 328 appearances in eleven years. Whilst at Orient, Roffey was part of the side that reached the FA Cup semi final in 1978, where the team lost 3–0 to Arsenal at Stamford Bridge. After a loan period at Brentford in 1984, (13 games, one goal), he finished his Football League career at Millwall, for whom he made 37 appearances over the next two seasons scoring twice. Roffey made a total of 401 league appearances between 1972 and 1986.

Later career

Roffey then had a spell away from football before moving into non-league football with Barnet in 1988, (two appearances). He then spent three seasons with Leixões of Portugal before retiring at the end of the 1990–91 season. However, in 1991, Roffey joined former Leyton Orient playing colleague, Tommy Taylor, then manager at Margate, and went on to make 38 appearances in season 1991–92, scoring three times. For 1992–93, Roffey joined Canterbury City where he stayed until 1994 including a brief stint as player-manager. He then returned to Margate as manager but despite having retired after leaving Canterbury City, continued as a player, making 35 appearances in season 1994–95, without scoring. In 1995 Roffey moved to Tonbridge Angels where he initially worked as assistant-manager alongside Phil Emblem. However, during the season, Roffey replaced Emblem as manager and also made playing appearances, mainly as a substitute. Roffey continued to serve Tonbridge as manager until October 1997 when he resigned and ended his involvement with football.

References

External links
 
 

Living people
1954 births
English footballers
Footballers from Stepney
Association football defenders
English Football League players
Crystal Palace F.C. players
Leyton Orient F.C. players
Brentford F.C. players
Millwall F.C. players
Barnet F.C. players
Leixões S.C. players
Margate F.C. players
Canterbury City F.C. players
Tonbridge Angels F.C. players
English football managers
Canterbury City F.C. managers
Margate F.C. managers
Tonbridge Angels F.C. managers